Sacrifice and Bliss is the seventh studio album by the Philadelphia band Stinking Lizaveta.

Track listing

 "Autochthony! Autochthony!" - 5:03
 "A Day Without A Murder" - 3:49
 "Zeitgeist, The Movie" - 3:39
 "When I Love You" - 3:49
 "Sacrifice and Bliss" - 4:29
 "We Will See" - 5:22
 "A Man Without A Country" - 2:33
 "Superluxation" - 3:51
 "Trouble Mountain" - 4:16
 "The Man Needs Your Pain" - 3:55

External links
Sacrifice and Bliss by Stinking Lizaveta @ Encyclopaedia Metallum

2009 albums
Stinking Lizaveta albums